Huang Yuanji (Chinese: 黄元济; Pinyin: Huáng Yuánjì) a character featured within the famed classic Chinese novel Investiture of the Gods (more commonly known as Fenshen Yanyi). 

Huang Yuanji is the second greatest general (the first being Mei Wu) under Chong Houhu, a head official within the Shang Dynasty. During the time of the Su Hu coalition led by Chong Houhu, Huang Yuanji remained primarily under the defense forces. However, once Chong Houhu's forces were flamed out of a large forest, Huang Yuanji fought to the death in the name of his lord. Following King Wen's attack upon Tiger Town (Chong Houhu's capital), Huang Yuanji was the first general to defend the capital. With his great sword in his hand, Huang Yuanji charged at General Nangong Kuo; a fine duel ensued. However, Nangong found an opening in Huang Yuanji and cut him down. Once lying upon the ground, before death, Huang Yuanji gazed at the sky one final time in the name of his sworn lord, Chong Houhu.

Huang Yuanji was appointed as the deity of Canchu Star (蚕畜星) in the end.

Notes

References
 Investiture of the Gods Chapter 28

Investiture of the Gods characters